Euclasta gigantalis is a species of moth in the family Crambidae.  The female has a wingspan of 45mm.

Distribution
It is found in Ethiopia, Kenya, La Réunion and Madagascar.

In 1988 this moth was also released in Australia for biological control of Cryptostegia grandiflora.

Biology
The larvae feed on Camptocarpus mauritianus, Cryptostegia grandiflora, Cryptostegia madagascariensis (Apocynaceae) and Clerodendrum heterophyllum (Lamiaceae).

References

Moths described in 1957
Pyraustinae
Lepidoptera used as pest control agents